Lara Rossi is a British actress. She is known for her role as Arabela Seeger in the German-French-Italian-American television series Crossing Lines as well as the Finnish sci-fi movie Iron Sky: The Coming Race. She also played the part of Lady Sybil Ramkin in The Watch, a 2021 fantasy police procedural series for BBC America based on the Discworld novels by Terry Pratchett.

Filmography

Film
 Esio Trot (2015)
 Anchor and Hope (2017)
 Robin Hood (2018)
 Iron Sky: The Coming Race (2019)
 Military Wives (2019)

TV
 Agatha Raisin
 Crossing Lines
 Life of Crime
 Murder
 The Shadow Line
 Cheat
 Flesh and Blood
 I May Destroy You
 The Watch
 Angela Black
 The Midwich Cuckoos (2022)

Selected theatre
 Anne Elliot in Persuasion at the Royal Exchange, Manchester (2017)
 "Woman" in The Writer by Ella Hickson at the Almeida Theatre, London (2018)

References

External links 

Living people
British television actresses
British film actresses
British stage actresses
Year of birth missing (living people)